Cecil Hobart Peabody (1855 – 1934) was an American mechanical engineer, born on August 9 in Burlington, Vermont. He was very influential in the development of the Mechanical Engineering Department and in founding the Department of Naval Architecture at the Massachusetts Institute of Technology (MIT).

Education and Career 
Peabody graduated from MIT in 1877. He became assistant professor of steam engineering in 1883 and in 1893 professor of marine engineering and naval architecture. Between graduation and his return to Boston he was Professor of Mathematics and Engineering at the Sapporo Imperial Agricultural College of Japan for two years and assistant professor of mechanical engineering in the University of Illinois. Shortly after beginning his teaching career at MIT Peabody published in 1888 the Tables of Properties of Saturated Steam and Other Vapors and invented the throttling calorimeter. Peabody was ever expanding the course offerings at MIT and in his first year of teaching established courses in Marine Engineering and in 1891 courses in Naval Architecture. The courses led to the development of the Department of Naval Architecture and Marine Engineering in 1893. Peabody retired in 1920 from head of the Department of Naval Architecture.

Publications 
 Tables of the Properties of Saturated Steam and Other Vapors (1888; eighth edition, 1909)
 Thermodynamics of the Steam Engine and other Heat-Engines (1889; sixth edition, 1910)
 Valve-Gears for Steam-Engines (1892)
 Steam Boilers, with E. F. Miller, (1897; third edition, 1912)
 Manual of the Steam Engine Indicator (1900)
 Naval Architecture (1904; third edition, 1911)
 Propellers (1912)
 Computation for Marine Engines (1913)
 Thermodynamics of the Steam Turbine

References

MIT School of Engineering faculty
American science writers
Massachusetts Institute of Technology alumni
American engineers
Writers from Burlington, Vermont
1855 births
1934 deaths